NFTP may refer to:
 Niuatoputapu Airport
 National Freelance Training Program, online training program in Pakistan